The men's all-around championship event was held at Francis Field in St. Louis, Missouri on July 4, 1904. It was the only time the all-around, a forerunner to the later decathlon, was contested at the Olympics; whether the competition was part of the Olympic program has been disputed, but the International Olympic Committee currently recognizes it as an official Olympic event. 

7 athletes from 2 nations competed. Tom Kiely, an Irishman, won with 6036 points.

Results

100 yard dash

Shot put

High jump

880 yard walk

Hammer throw

Pole vault

120 yard hurdles

56 pound weight throw

Long jump

1 mile run

Sources

 

All-around